Gateway Academy is a privately owned charter high school in Laredo, Texas,  operated by Student Alternatives Program, Inc.(a non-profit corporation dedicated to providing  educational choices to students and sponsors for charter schools throughout Texas). 

Gateway Academy is a charter high school offering education from grades 9 to 12.  Its flexible schedule allows the students to study in the morning or the afternoon.

References

External links
 Official Website 

Charter schools in Texas
Public high schools in Texas